Koho or KOHO may refer to:
Koho language, a language of Vietnam
K'Ho an ethnic group of Vietnam
Kōhō, a Japanese era
Koho, Burkina Faso, a town
Koho (company), an ice hockey equipment company
Koho (fintech), a Canadian neobank
KOHO-FM, a radio station
KOHO-AM, a Japanese language radio station in Honolulu, Hawaii active from 1959 to 2000
Nickname for retired NHL referee Don Koharski
Ville Koho (born 1982), Finnish ice hockey player

See also 
 Coho (disambiguation)